Caniapiscau Aerodrome, formerly , was located near Caniapiscau in Quebec, Canada.

See also
Lac Pau (Caniapiscau) Water Aerodrome

References

Registered aerodromes in Côte-Nord
Defunct airports in Quebec